The Jorgensen Nunataks are a small group of two rock nunataks, rising above the ice-covered ridge which descends eastward from Mount Picciotto, in the Queen Elizabeth Range of Antarctica. They were named by the Advisory Committee on Antarctic Names for Arthur E. Jorgensen, a United States Antarctic Research Program meteorologist at South Pole Station in the winter of 1958.

References

Nunataks of the Ross Dependency
Shackleton Coast